John A. Delaney (born 4 June 1986) is an Irish sportsperson. He plays hurling with his local club Clough–Ballacolla and has been a member of the Laois senior inter-county team since 2006.

References

1986 births
Living people
Clough-Ballacolla hurlers
Laois inter-county hurlers